The Book of Brownies is a book by Enid Blyton published in 1926.

The Book of Brownies is the story of three naughty brownies: Hop, Skip and Jump, who are tricked by Witch Green-eyes into helping her to kidnap the Princess Peronel. They are banished from Fairyland until they find their 'Goodness'. They decide that they have an obligation to save the Princess from the Witch and have many adventures. Their adventures include confronting various messy situations like being caught in a cottage without a door, accidentally bumping into the island of the notorious red goblin, then in an island of giants, then their adventure in the Land of clever people where you have to always speak in rhyme and make up a riddle everyday, then in the green railway and toadstool town. They also fight the Golden dwarf, rescue the Dragon-bird and finally, after encountering countless odd adventures, they rescue the princess

References
Citations

Bibliography

External links

1926 British novels
1926 fantasy novels
Children's fantasy novels
Novels by Enid Blyton
Novels about fairies and sprites
1926 children's books
Brownies (folklore)
George Newnes Ltd books